Župeno is a small village north of Gorenje Otave in the Municipality of Cerknica in the Inner Carniola region of Slovenia.

References

External links 

Župeno on Geopedia

Populated places in the Municipality of Cerknica